Dezperadoz (formerly Desperados) is a German "Western-metal" band and is the side-project of Tom Angelripper's guitarist Alex Kraft. The band plays heavy metal music that is heavily influenced by the soundtracks of the 1960s and 1970s Spaghetti Western movies. They've released four albums, two on the German heavy metal record label AFM. They've also had guest appearances by many notable heavy metal musicians including Michael Weikath, Tobias Sammet, Joacim Cans, and Doro Pesch.

Biography
Alex Kraft (Onkel Tom, Sodom a.o.). started Dezperadoz originally as a project - back then called "Desperados" with Tom Angelripper (Sodom, Onkel Tom) on vocals. The intention was to transfer the rough atmosphere of old Italo-Western movies into today's world of rock and metal.

After the release of Dawn of Dying (2000, Drakkar Records), Dezperadoz saw a longer work break and some line-up changes. Alex Kraft decided to take over the lead vocal part. In 2006, Dezperadoz release the second record, The Legend and the Truth, produced by Dennis Ward (Pink Cream 69) and published by AFM Records. The record turns out to be a concept album which brings to life the Western-legend Wyatt Earp, musically. As special guests, Tobias Sammet, Michael Weikath, Doro and others are featured for some speaking parts. Support tours and festival shows follow.

In 2008, the third opus An Eye for an Eye, another concept album, is released. Traveling back in time to 1898, it tells the story of a man of belief and honor. Seeking bloody revenge, he kills his best friend and is sentenced to death, ultimately. Through his eyes, we witness the last minutes of his life. Once more, this album is produced by Dennis Ward and published by AFM Records.

Throughout their career, Dezperados has supported artists such as Krokus, Gotthard, Thin Lizzy, Rage, Sodom, Doro, Volbeat, U.D.O., Tesla, and many others on stage. They have also performed at festival shows like Wacken Open Air, With Full Force, Earthshaker, Summerbreeze and others gigs and tours through Europe and Russia.

In 2012, with a new record contract signed by their old companions, Drakkar Records, the fourth album, Dead Man's Hand was released, as well as a new edition of the first record Dawn of Dying, which includes a bonus track.

In May 2017, after a few line-up changes, the band released the new album Call of the Wild, a concept album about Billy The Kid, whom was known as an American gunfighter of the wild west.

Discography

 The Dawn of Dying - Full-length, 2000
 The Legend and the Truth - Full-length, 2006
 An Eye for an Eye - Full-length, 2008
 Dead Man's Hand - Full-length, 2012
 Call of the Wild -  Full length, 2017

External links

References

German heavy metal musical groups
German thrash metal musical groups
German country rock groups
Musical groups established in 2000
2000 establishments in Germany
Musical groups from Baden-Württemberg
Western music (North America)